The municipally-owned Port of Gothenburg is the largest port in the Nordic countries, with over 11,000 ship visits per year from over 140 destinations worldwide. As the only Swedish port with the capacity to cope with the very largest modern, ocean-going container ships, Gothenburg handles nearly 30% of the country's foreign trade, comprising 39 million tonnes of freight per year.

Geography 

The port is situated on both sides of the estuary of Göta älv in Gothenburg. The north shore, Norra Älvstranden, is on Hisingen island and the south shore, Södra Älvstranden, is on the mainland.

Port sections 
The port is divided into a number of sections or harbors.
South shore

Älvnabbens petroleumhamn, (older)
Tånguddens hamn
Nya Varvet, (older)
Carnegiekajen, (older) dock length , depth 
Klippan, (older)
Majnabbehamnen, dock length , depth 
Varvet Kusten (older)
Göteborgs fiskhamn
Gamla Varvet, (older)
Stigbergskajen, dock length , depth 
Masthuggskajen, dock length , depth 
Skeppsbrokajen, dock length , depth 
Stenpiren, dock length , depth 
Stora Hamnen/Stora Hamnkanalen, (older)
Packhuskajen, dock length , depth 
Lilla Bommen
Gullbergskajen, dock length , depth 
Gasverkskajen, (older) dock length , depth 
Lärjehamnen, (older) dock length , depth 
Rosenlundskanalen

North shore

Torshamnen, dock length , depth 
Torshamnen, dock length , depth 
Arendal, dock length , depth 
Älvsborgshamnen, dock length , depth 
Skandiahamnen, dock length , depth 
Skarvikshamnen, dock length , depth 
Ryahamnen, dock length , depth 
Eriksbergshamnen
Sannegårdshamnen, (older) dock length , depth 
Lindholmshamnen, (older) dock length , depth 
Lundbyhamnen, dock length , depth 
Frihamnen, dock length , depth 
Ringökajen, dock length , depth 
Kvarnen Tre Lejon, (older) dock length , depth

Capacity and cargo 

In 2013 the port handled approximately 860,000 containers (TEU) and 160,000 new cars (both import and export). It has 24 scheduled rail freight shuttles, serving Norway and Sweden.

The primary imports are crude oil (20 million tonnes in 2013), textiles and food. The primary exports are new vehicles (trucks, cars, buses, heavy plant), steel and paper. There are specialised terminals for containers, ro-ro, cars, passengers (1.7 million in 2013) and oil and other energy products.

The port is large and deep enough to accommodate even very large ships, such as the Maya of the Mediterranean Shipping Company that arrived at the port on 21December 2015.

See also 

APM Terminals
Bergslagernas Järnvägar
List of busiest ports in Europe
Maersk Triple E class
Preemraff Göteborg
Roll-on-roll-off discharge facility
Viking (barque)
Vinga (Gothenburg)
Volvo

References

External links 

 

Kattegat
Gothenburg
Municipally owned companies
Companies based in Gothenburg
Hisingen
Oil terminals
Articles containing video clips